Alcovy may refer to:

Alcovy, Georgia
Alcovy Mountain
Alcovy River